Eucalyptus  urnularis is a species of small tree that is endemic to the Northern Territory.

Eucalyptus × urnularis was first formally described in 1985 by Denis John Carr and Stella Grace Maisie Carr from specimens collected "6.8 km north-west of the El Sharana mine" in 1973. The description was published in Eucalyptus 1 – New or little-known species of the Corymbosae. In Flora of Australia, George Chippendale described this as "a newly described taxon which has not been fully evaluated".

References

x urnularis
Myrtales of Australia
Flora of the Northern Territory
Plants described in 1985
Plant nothospecies
Taxa named by Maisie Carr